Enduro is a racing video game designed by Larry Miller for the Atari 2600 and published by Activision in 1983. Miller previously wrote Spider Fighter for Activision. The object of the game is to complete an endurance race, passing a certain number of cars each day to continue the next day. The visuals change from day to night, and there is occasional inclement weather. A ZX Spectrum port was published in 1984

Activision released The Great American Cross-Country Road Race, which expands upon the design of Enduro, for home computers in 1985.

Gameplay

Enduro consists of maneuvering a race car in the National Enduro, a long-distance endurance race. The object of the race is to pass a certain number of cars each day. Doing so will allow the player to continue racing for the next day. The driver must avoid other racers and pass 200 cars on the first day, and 300 cars with each following day.

As the time in the game passes, visibility changes as well. When it is night in the game the player can only see the oncoming cars' taillights. As the days progress, cars will become more difficult to avoid as well. Weather and time of day are factors in how to play. During the day the player may drive through an icy patch on the road which would limit control of the vehicle, or a patch of fog may reduce visibility.

If a player succeeds in racing five days or more, an on-screen racing trophy pops up. At the time of release, if the player sent a photograph of this achievement to Activision, they received a patch declaring them an "Activision Roadbuster".

The game has no end. If the player reaches 999.999 points or km, the counter resets and starts from zero and the game continues in an infinite loop.

Release
In 1983, Activision ran the "Enduro Race-For-Riches Sweepstakes". The grand prize was a Datsun 280ZX pace car and a trip for two to Caesars Palace Grand Prix Weekend. The second prize was a Datsun 200SX Hatchback SL, the third prize was a trip for two to Caesars Palace Grand Prix Weekend, the fourth prize was one of 50 radio controlled cars, the fifth prize was one of 500 Activision Grand Prix video game cartridges, and the sixth prize was one of 2,000 Datsun Racing posters.

Reception
Enduro received the award for "1984 Best Sports Videogame" at the 5th annual Arkie Awards where judges praised it for "featur[ing] some of the best graphics presented by a 2600 and boast[ing] an intriguing concept". Computer and Video Games reviewed the game in 1989, giving it a 77% score.

Legacy
In 1985 Activision released The Great American Cross-Country Road Race, a home computer game that follows the design of Enduro, but with enhanced visuals, audio, and some additional gameplay elements. Enduro was later included in Activision's Atari 2600 Action Pack 2 in 1995 and the Activision Anthology collection in 2002. Enduro is a mini-game within Call of Duty: Black Ops Cold War.

See also

List of Atari 2600 games
List of Activision games: 1980–1999
Grand Prix
The Great American Cross-Country Road Race
Pole Position, a 1982 motor-racing video game
Pole Position II, a 1983 sequel to the 1982 video game

References

External links
Enduro at AtariAge
Enduro at Atari Mania

1983 video games
Activision games
Atari 2600 games
Racing video games
ZX Spectrum games
Video games developed in the United States
Single-player video games